Çayönü can refer to:

 Çayönü
 Çayönü, Çayırlı
 Çayönü, Kozluk
 Çayönü, Mudanya